The hieracosphinx is a mythical beast found in Egyptian sculpture and European heraldry. The god Haroeris ("Horus the Elder") was usually depicted as one. The name Hieracosphinx comes from the Greek Ιερακόσφιγξ, which means ἱέραξ (Hawk) + Σφίγξ (Sphinx).

Description
The Hieracosphinx has the head of a hawk and the body of a lion. The name was coined by Herodotus to the hawk-headed sphinxes that he saw in Egypt (the other being the ram-headed sphinx which Herodotus called Criosphinx).

In popular culture
The Hieracosphinx is the name of a monster card in the Yu-Gi-Oh! Trading Card Game.

In the Real-time strategy game Age of Mythology, worshipping Bast allows players to upgrade their Sphinxes to Hieracosphinxes.

See also
 Ammit
 Griffin
 Hippogriff
 Sphinx
 Serpopard

References

External links

 Comparison of the hieracosphinx with other sphinx types

Egyptian legendary creatures
Fantasy creatures
Greek legendary creatures
Heraldic beasts
Mythological hybrids
Mythological lions
Sphinxes